The Altai snowcock (Tetraogallus altaicus) is a species of bird in the family Phasianidae. It is found in western Mongolia and adjacent areas of China, Kazakhstan and Russia. Its natural habitat is boreal forests.

Taxonomy
The Altai snowcock was first described by Frederic Gebler in 1836. He was a doctor and naturalist who lived in the Altai region for forty years and named many previously unknown species. There are two subspecies, Tetraogallus altaicus altaicus and Tetraogallus altaicus orientalis.

Description
The Altai snowcock is a plump, partridge-like bird. The head and neck are slatey-grey and there is a partial dark collar at the base of the neck. The upperparts are grey with white spots and the tail is black. The chin, breast and belly are white. The throat has a breastband of grey with patches of black. The primary and secondary feathers are black, the former having white bases which show as a white flash in flight. The beak is yellowish brown and the legs and feet reddish brown.

Distribution
The Altai snowcock is native to the mountain ranges of western Mongolia and southwestern Siberia. Its range includes in Russia the mountainous regions near Abakan, Sayan Mountains and the Tannu-Ola Mountains; and in Mongolia, the Mongolian Altai, the Govi-Altai, the Khangai Mountains, and the mountains east of Lake Khuvsgul.

Behaviour
The Altai snowcock feeds on buds, shoots, roots, berries and insects and it also occasionally eats small rodents. About forty different species of plants have been recorded to be part of the diet.

Conservation
Populations of Altai snowcock are believed to be decreasing as a result of over-hunting and degradation of their habitat. However, in its Red List of Threatened Species, the IUCN lists this species as being of "Least Concern" because it has a wide distribution over an estimated  and the number of mature birds is over 10,000 and not decreasing at such a rate as would justify their inclusion in a more vulnerable category.

References

Altai snowcock
Birds of Mongolia
Altai snowcock
Taxonomy articles created by Polbot